The town of Puertecitos is located 90 kilometers south of San Felipe, in the Mexican state of  Baja California. Puertecitos is a tourist spot for both vacationers and expatriates from the United States. The Puertecitos bay, which was permanently settled in 1949 by Rafael Orozco, overlooks the Gulf of California. There are a couple of hundred homes and mobile homes in Puertecitos, mostly lying on a low hill which overlooks the Gulf of California on the east side, and the inner bay of Puertecitos on the west side. 

Puertecitos receives an average of two inches of rain a year, and has the same climate as San Felipe.

Puertecitos is known primarily for its hot springs on the rocky coastline and being a tourist destination. There is a fee to use the natural hot springs. There are no hotel accommodations and gas is not always available at the Puertecitos Pemex station. It is advisable to fill up with gas in San Felipe prior to driving to Puertecitos. There are many different places to camp. Bahia Encantada has no restaurant but it does have running water and a nice bay with calm water. 

The best time to visit Puertecitos is in the spring or in autumn.

References
 2010 census tables: INEGI

Populated places in Baja California